Zeta is a feminine given name and a surname of Greek origin. It is also used as a masculine given name. People with the name are as follows:

Given name

Male
 Zeta Bosio, stage name of Héctor Juan Pedro Bosio Bertolotti (born 1958), Argentine musical artist 
 Oscar Zeta Acosta (1935–disappeared 1974), Mexican-American lawyer

Female
 Zeta Makripoulia (born 1978), Greek actress

Surname
 Catherine Zeta-Jones (born 1969), Welsh actress
 Pilar Zeta, Argentine multimedia artist

Fictional characters
 Zeta, a character in Gunnerkrigg Court
 Zeta, a character in Slave of the Huns
 Zeta, the main antagonist in the 2019 film The Angry Birds Movie 2
 Zeta the Sorceress, a character in Shimmer and Shine
 Infiltration Unit Zeta, a character in the DC Animated Universe

Greek feminine given names
Unisex given names